WAOC (1420 AM) is a radio station broadcasting a Christian talk and teaching format. Licensed to St. Augustine, Florida, United States, the station serves the Jacksonville area.  The station is currently owned Good Tidings Trust, Inc.

FM translator
WAOC programming is also relayed on an FM translator.

History

1950s

1954
WAOC begins broadcasting as WSTN on January 3.  It is initially a 1 kW daytimer.

1970s

WAOC was operating in the early 1970s as WAOC (Americas Oldest City) and broadcasting from a single-wide mobile home situated at the transmitter site out in the woods off SR 207.

1990s
WAOC airs a news/talk format in competition with WFOY. Later in the mid-1990s, the studio moved to the second-highest floor in the National Bank building on Cathedral Place in downtown St. Augustine. The station was a Country/Western format with local and national news on the half-hour, provided by A.P. teletype wire tickers. 
 Its sister station WJQR signs on.

2000s

2002
WAOC is bought by Shull Broadcasting & becomes a sister station to WFOY as "Real Country 1420".

2020s

2021
On May 14, 2021, WAOC changed formats from sports to a simulcast of religious-formatted WAYR 550 AM Fleming Island, branded as "Way Radio". Effective July 27, 2021, then owner Phillips Broadcasting sold WAOC and translator W243AW to Good Tidings Trust, Inc. for $199,000.

Controversy
Kevin Leslie Geddings, known on air as "Kevin Leslie" & also husband of WAOC owner Kris Phillips was sentenced on May 7, 2007, due to an October 2006 conviction of 5 counts of fraud when he served as the state lottery commissioner in North Carolina. Geddings must serve 4 years in federal prison in Jesup, Georgia, as well as pay a $25,000 fine. His conviction was vacated on August 27, 2010. The government was ordered to return the $25,000 fine and $500 special assessment Geddings paid. Source: St. Augustine Record. September 7, 2010.

Previous logos

References

External links

CBS Sports Radio stations
Radio stations established in 1954
1954 establishments in Florida
Christian radio stations in Florida